Tylonotus is a genus of beetles in the family Cerambycidae, containing the following species:

 Tylonotus bimaculatus Haldeman, 1847
 Tylonotus masoni (Knull, 1928)

References

Hesperophanini